Mua (also spelled Mu'a, Uvean for "first") is one of the 5 districts of Wallis and Futuna, located in Wallis Island, in the Pacific Ocean. It is part of the Chiefdom of Uvea.

Geography
Located in the southern side of the island, Mua borders with the districts of Hahake. Mala'efo'ou (formerly named Mu'a) is the administrative seat.

The district is divided into 10 municipal villages:

See also
Fineveke

References

External links

Chiefdoms and districts of Wallis and Futuna